Godfrey Adotey (born 26 August 2003) is a Ghanaian professional footballer who plays as a forward for Ghanaian Premier League side Karela United.

Club career

Karela United 
In October 2020, Karela United announced that they had signed Adotey on a 2-year contract ahead of the 2020–21 Ghana Premier League season. He made his debut on 10 January 2021, in a match 3–1 loss against Techiman Eleven Wonders. He played the full 90 minutes of the game and made an assist for Diawisie Taylor to equalize in the 72nd minute.

International career 
Adotey was a member of the Ghana national under-17 football team in 2020. He was called up to the Ghana national under-20 football team also in 2020, but didn't make the final squad for the 2021 Africa U-20 Cup of Nations.

References

External links 

 

Living people
2003 births
Association football midfielders
Karela United FC players
Ghana Premier League players
Ghana youth international footballers
Ghanaian footballers